James Corden's World Cup Live is a comedy chat show hosted by comedian James Corden during the 2010 FIFA World Cup.
The show was broadcast after every ITV evening match with Abbey Clancy, celebrity guests, a football hero, a studio full of fans, Corden's friends and family, his human World Cup wall chart, and challenges for his celebrity guests, such as 'How Many Peter Jones?', 'Heston Blumen-Cool or Heston Blumem-Fool?' or 'Uru-Guy or Uru-Girl?' and 'Joachim Löw or Joachim No?'. The programme also features exclusive interviews with some of the biggest names in English football, plus regular updates of what was happening in the England players' camp.

Episodes

Writing credits
(in alphabetical order)
 Kevin Day
 Phil Kerr
 Andy Milligan
 Matt Morgan
 Aiden Spackman

References

External links

2010s British comedy television series
2010s British sports television series
2010s British television talk shows
2010 British television series debuts
2010 British television series endings
British television talk shows
ITV (TV network) original programming
ITV Sport